Marcus R. Oshiro (born April 24, 1959 in Honolulu, Hawaii) is an American politician and a Democratic member of the Hawaii House of Representatives since January 16, 2013 representing District 46. Oshiro consecutively served from January 1995 until 2013 in the District 40 and 39 seats.

Education
Oshiro earned his BA from the University of Hawaii at Manoa and his JD from Willamette University College of Law. He was a member of the inaugural 1997 class of the Pacific Century Fellows.

Elections
2012 Redistricted to District 46, and with Democratic Representative Gil Riviere redistricted to District 47, Oshiro was unopposed for the August 11, 2012 Democratic Primary, winning with 2,808 votes, and won the November 6, 2012 General election against Republican nominee Christopher Murphy.
1994 When Democratic Representative Robert Bunda ran for Hawaii Senate and left the House District 40 seat open, Oshiro won the September 17, 1994 Democratic Primary with 2,013 votes (50.6%), and won the three-way November 8, 1994 General election with 3,348 votes (52.2%) against Republican nominee Yoshiro Nakamura and Best Party candidate Loree Johnson.
1996 Oshiro won the September 21, 1996 Democratic Primary with 2,787 votes (64.4%), and was unopposed for the November 5, 1996 General election.
1998 Oshiro was unopposed for the September 19, 1998 Democratic Primary, winning with 2,405, and won the November 3, 1998 General election with 4,653 votes (69.3%) against Republican nominee Raymond Santana.
2000 Oshiro was unopposed for the September 23, 2000 Democratic Primary, winning with 2,501 votes, and won the November 5, 2002 General election with 3,145 votes (55.9%) against Republican nominee Allan Tomas.
2002 Redistricted to District 39, and with Republican Representative Guy Ontai redistricted to District 37, Oshiro was unopposed for the September 21, 2002 Democratic Primary, winning with 2,381 votes, and won the November 5, 2002 General election with 4,430 votes (66.6%) against Republican nominee Cynthia Jenkins. who had been redistricted from District 6.
2004 Oshiro was unopposed for the September 18, 2004 Democratic Primary, winning with 2,519 votes, and won the November 2, 2004 General election with 5,160 votes (71.7%) against Republican nominee Augustina Tomas, who had run for the seat in 2002 but lost the primary.
2006 Oshiro was unopposed for the September 26, 2006 Democratic Primary, winning with 3,029 votes, and won the November 7, 2006 General election with 4,045 votes (71.0%) against Republican nominee Gail Dukes-Requilman.
2008 Oshiro was unopposed for both the September 20, 2008 Democratic Primary, winning with 2,168 votes, and the November 4, 2008 General election.
2010 Oshiro was unopposed for the September 18, 2010 Democratic Primary, winning with 2,928 votes, and won the November 2, 2010 General election with 3,769 votes (62.5%) against Republican nominee Sam Curtis.

References

External links
Official page at the Hawaii State Legislature
 

1959 births
Living people
Hawaii lawyers
Democratic Party members of the Hawaii House of Representatives
Politicians from Honolulu
University of Hawaiʻi at Mānoa alumni
Willamette University College of Law alumni
21st-century American politicians
Hawaii politicians of Japanese descent